Murray McLauchlan was a 1972 Folk Rock album by Canadian singer, songwriter, guitarist, pianist, broadcaster and actor, Murray McLauchlan.

Murray travelled to New York City to record this album, between June and July at The Record Plant. This is evident in his backing musicians which include a number of well known American musicians of the time including Tony Levin, Charlie Hayward of the Charlie Daniels Band and David Spinozza. He also enlisted record producer Ed Freeman who had produced Don McLean's best selling album American Pie the previous year.

The album is notable as well for containing the first known commercially released version of the Warren Zevon song "Carmelita", which will not be released by Zevon himself until 1976, and would later also be covered by Linda Ronstadt in 1977. McLauchlan would later perform a version of Carmelita on a 1989 TV show recorded at Toronto's Diamond Club featuring a vocal duet with Canadian alt-country singer Lori Yates.

Track listing 
All tracks composed by Murray McLauchlan; except where noted.
Side 1
 "No Time Together Today" 3:32
 "Lady Soul" 3:05
 "I Wanna Watch You Move" 3:09
 "Old Man's Song" 3:26
 "Billy McDaniels" 2:47

Side 2
 "Lose We" 2:25
 "Quiet Places to Come Home To" 3:16
 "Carmelita" (Warren Zevon) 4:08
 "Big Bad City" 3:38
 "The Farmer's Song" 3:05

Personnel
Murray McLauchlan – vocals, guitar, piano
Charlie Hayward – bass
Buzzy Feiten - lead guitar on "Lady Soul"
Tony Levin - bass on "Big Bad City"
David Spinozza - guitar on "Big Bad City"
Neil Larsen - organ on "Lady Soul"
Richard Killgore - drums
Warren Bernhardt - keyboards
Mike Mainieri - vibes
Larry Kraman - synthesizer
Paul Prestopino - dobro
Eric Weissberg - mandolin
Tom Flye and the West 44th Street Rhythm and Noise Choir - additional drums and percussion 
Raun MacKinnon, Mike Wendroff, Kathleen Whelen, Allan Jacobs, Jerry Burnham - backing vocals
Technical
Dennis Ferrante, Jack Douglas, Roy Cicala, Tom Flye - engineer

External links
 Murray McLauchlan
 Murray McLauchlan Album
 Murray McLauchlan Carmelita (Live with Lori Yates): Murray McLauchlan

1972 albums
Murray McLauchlan albums
True North Records albums
Albums recorded at Record Plant (New York City)